The Barak–Brahmaputra Express is a weekly Express train which runs between the Silchar and New Tinsukia stations in Assam, India. It comes under the Northeast Frontier Railway zone. This train is named after Indian rivers Brahmaputra and  Barak, both of which are two main rivers of Assam and also they are important for connectivity in Barak & Brahmaputra Valley.

Overview
This train was inaugurated on 8 April 2018. It was flagged off by Sarbananda Sonowal (former Chief Minister of Assam) and Rajen Gohain (former Minister of state of Railways), from Dibrugarh with an weekly frequency train service and It was ran as Silchar–Dibrugarh Express. After 2 months in June 2018 this train name was given as Barak Brahmaputra Express.

Routes

Traction
As this route is not electrified so WDP-4D Locomotive of Diesel Loco Shed, Siliguri pulls the train on both directions.

Rake sharing

The train shares its rake with 12507 Aronai Express and 12515/16 Coimbatore–Silchar Express.

References

Named passenger trains of India
Rail transport in Assam
Rail transport in Nagaland
Transport in Silchar
Transport in Dibrugarh
Express trains in India